Archeological Site 3PP141 is a prehistoric rock art site in Pope County, Arkansas.  The art at the site, which is on state-owned land, is believed to have been painted during the period of the Mississippian culture.  The 28 drawings at this site are part of a larger collection within the state that are expected to improve the understanding of Mississippian religious practices during that time.

The site was listed on the National Register of Historic Places in 2006,

See also
 Archeological Site 3PP142
 National Register of Historic Places listings in Pope County, Arkansas

References

Archaeological sites on the National Register of Historic Places in Arkansas
National Register of Historic Places in Pope County, Arkansas
Rock art in North America
Mississippian culture
Native American history of Arkansas